Ellen Sandweiss is an American actress. She is best known for her role as Cheryl Williams in The Evil Dead franchise.

Career
Sandweiss was born in Detroit, Michigan and is a graduate of the University of Michigan. She went to Groves High School, where she participated in plays and later Super 8 movies with Sam Raimi and Bruce Campbell. She gained notoriety in the 1981 horror cult-classic The Evil Dead, playing Ash Williams' sister Cheryl. Afterwards, she went on a hiatus from acting for over 20 years. In 2006, Sandweiss starred in Satan's Playground. The following year, she appeared in My Name is Bruce. In 2013, Sandweiss had a cameo role in Sam Raimi's Oz the Great and Powerful. In 2016, Sandweiss reprised her role as Cheryl Williams in Ash vs. Evil Dead, the character being reborn as a Deadite after a Kandarian demon possesses a photo of her.

Personal life
Sandweiss has performed in musical theatre as a dancer and pop singer, and in a one-woman show of Jewish music. Her daughter is actress Jessy Hodges.

Filmography

Video Games

References

External links 
 Ellen Sandweiss Interview at Deadites Online
 

Living people
University of Michigan alumni
American female dancers
American women pop singers
American musical theatre actresses
American stage actresses
American film actresses
Dancers from Michigan
21st-century American women singers
21st-century American singers
Year of birth missing (living people)